The Sarawak State Legislative Assembly is the legislative chamber of the unicameral legislature of the Malaysian state of Sarawak; the Yang di-Pertua Negeri of Sarawak forms the other part of the legislature. The Assembly is modelled after the traditions of the Westminster parliamentary system, which originates from the practices of the British Parliament. The executive branch of government is drawn from the elected members of the Assembly. The State Legislative Assembly sits at the Sarawak State Legislative Assembly Building located in Petra Jaya in Kuching, the state capital.

The Legislative Assembly, as of 2019, consists of 82 members, making it the largest state legislature in Malaysia. Members are elected from single-member constituencies throughout the state under the first-past-the-post voting system, with elections held no more than five years apart. Sarawak does not practice compulsory voting, and eligible citizens are not automatically registered to vote in elections. Elections for the Assembly have been out-of-sync with the rest of Malaysia since 1978.

The Assembly is also the oldest legislature in Malaysia and one of the oldest continuously functioning legislatures in the world, being established on 8 September 1867 as the General Council under the Raj of Sarawak. In 1903, the General Council became the Council Negri, which lasted through the remainder of the Raj and continued throughout the colonial period and into the early years of the federation. However, the legislature was not directly elected until 1969.

The executive is formed by the party or parties who commands the confidence and supply of the Assembly, with the leader of said party or parties becoming the  Premier, the head of government of the state. The formal appointment of the Chief Minister is performed by the Yang di-Pertua Negeri. Since 2018, the Gabungan Parti Sarawak coalition holds a majority in the Assembly, after the component parties split from the Barisan Nasional coalition in the aftermath of the general election. Abang Abdul Rahman Johari Abang Openg has been the Chief Minister since 2017.

History 
The first legislative assembly in Sarawak was formed during the rule of the White Rajahs. The General Council (Majlis Umum) of the Kingdom of Sarawak was convened on 8 September 1867 by Charles Brooke, the Rajah Muda under the orders of James Brooke, then the Rajah of Sarawak. Its members were chosen from local tribe leaders who were thought to be capable of assisting Brooke in administering the kingdom. The General Council later evolved into the Council Negri in 1903. The Council Negri first met in Bintulu. In 1976, Council Negri formally changed its name to Dewan Undangan Negeri (legislative assembly) through amendment of Sarawak constitution.

It continued to function even after Sarawak was ceded to the British Empire in 1946. Since 1963, when Sarawak joined with Malaya, Singapore and North Borneo (now known as Sabah) to form Malaysia, in line with the federal and state constitutions, members of the Assembly have been elected representatives.

The General Council members in 1867 were restricted to five British officers and 16 Malay and Melanau members with Rajah as the president. As the population of the state grew, so do the members of the General Council. In 1937, Chinese and Ibans were included in the membership. The 1941 constitution of Sarawak supposedly end the Rajah's absolute rule over the council, however did not materialise due to Japanese occupation. In 1956, another constitution was drawn to expand the composition to 24 elected unofficial members, including 14 ex-officio, four nominated members, and three standing members. The unofficial members were elected through indirect three-tier system. In 1963, the membership was increased from 24 to 36 members.

In 1969, the Assembly had 48 seats elected from single-member constituencies. This increased to 56 in 1985, to 62 in 1985 and to 71 in 2005. In 2014, the Assembly passed an Ordinance to take the number of constituencies to 82. It has the largest number of seats among the state legislatures in Malaysia.

Role 
The Legislative Assembly is constituted under article 13 of the state constitution. The Assembly has the power to legislate on any matter for the state, except those that are within the exclusive domain of the federal Parliament as set out in the Federal List of the ninth schedule of the federal constitution. The Concurrent List (including the supplement) in the same schedule specifies the subjects that both the Assembly and Parliament may legislate for; however, the federal law prevails where they conflict. The State List (including the supplement) are matters that are exclusively under the jurisdiction of the state. However, the Assembly also has residual powers over any matters that are not specified in the schedule.

Primary legislation successfully passed in the Assembly are styled Ordinances. The Assembly must sit at least once every six months (and often only does so at that frequency) to approve taxation to and supply from the state's consolidated fund. This is done during the tabling of the budget by the executive Cabinet. Aside from administrative matters, members of the Assembly are free to speak on any issues, as stipulated in the Privileges, Immunities and Powers Ordinance 1963. Members of the Assembly are responsible for scrutinising the executive government's actions.

The Speaker presides over proceedings in the Assembly. They are appointed by the Yang di-Pertua Negeri (Governor) on the advice of the Chief Minister. The Speaker does not vote in any proceeding except to break a tie, and even then would only vote according to Speaker Denison's rule by convention.

Procedures 
The Legislative Assembly meets at the Sarawak State Legislative Assembly Building in Petra Jaya, Kuching. The chamber is furnished in red, similar to upper houses of Westminster system parliaments. Four rows of desks (benches) are located on opposite sides of the chamber, furnished with leather office chairs, individual microphones and electronic voting equipment. The Speaker's desk is at the end of the chamber furthest from the entrance; the Secretaries' desk is located directly in front of the Speaker to allow them to advise the Speaker on procedural matters when necessary. In front of the Secretaries' desk is the Table of the Assembly, on which the Mace rests. During the opening of the Assembly, the Governor addresses the Assembly from a throne behind the Speaker's chair. The Sergeant-at-Arms sit at the entrance of the chamber, opposite the Speaker.

Government members sit on the benches on the Speaker's right, while Opposition members take their seats on the Speaker's left. However, government MLAs may overflow onto the opposition's side of the chamber, in which case they occupy the seats furthest from the Speaker first. Government ministers and the shadow cabinet occupy the front rows and are thus known as frontbenchers, with the Premier and Leader of the Opposition sitting closest to the Speaker. All other members are known as backbenchers (regardless of whether they are sitting on the front row or back). The chamber has enough seats for 112 members, 30 more than the current number of members.

The Assembly is constitutionally required to sit at least once every six months, and often only does as such. Sittings are held on Mondays to Fridays until all business for the session is concluded (usually about two weeks). In exceptional circumstances, a sitting may also be held on a weekend.

Proceedings in the Assembly are governed by standing orders. Standing orders are adopted at the start of each term of the Assembly. Public debates are recorded and archived in the Official Reports, also commonly known as the Hansard.

Each year, a new session of the Assembly begins with a ceremonial opening of the Assembly, in which the Governor, in the presence of all members, delivers an address outlining the government's legislative agenda.

During debates, Members may speak only if called upon by the Speaker (or a Deputy Speaker, if the Speaker is not presiding). Traditionally, the presiding officer alternates between calling members from the government and opposition. The Premier, the Leader of the Opposition, and other leaders from both sides are normally given priority.

Sarawak is unusual within Malaysia in that both Malay and English have equal standing in proceedings of the Legislative Assembly – debates frequently switch between both languages and members may choose to use either or both. Speeches are addressed to the presiding officer, using the words Tuan Speaker, Puan Speaker, Tuan Timbalan Speaker or Puan Timbalan Speaker as appropriate. Only the presiding officer may be directly addressed in debate; other members must be referred to in the third person. Traditionally, members do not refer to each other by name, but by constituency, using forms such as "the Honourable Member for [constituency]" in English or "Ahli Yang Berhormat untuk [constituency]" in Malay. Members of the same party (or allied parties or groups) may refer to each other as "my friend" or "kawan kita". This may not always be the case during the actual oral delivery, when it might be difficult for a member to remember another member's exact constituency, but it is invariably followed in the transcript entered in the Hansard. The Speaker enforces the rules of the House and may warn and punish members who deviate from them. Disregarding the Speaker's instructions is considered a breach of the rules of the House and may result in the suspension of the offender from the House. In the case of grave disorder, the Speaker may adjourn the House without taking a vote.

At the start of every day of sitting, time is allotted for backbenchers to ask questions of government ministers (including the chief minister) that they must answer to scrutinise the government's activities. Questions are generally required to be placed on the notice paper prior to the sitting, but questions without notice may sometimes be permitted. In practice, non-constituency-related questions asked in question time are usually pre-arranged by each party.

Timeslots may sometimes be allocated to opposition or independent members to propose their own bills, although these rarely pass without governmental support. Every bill that becomes law goes through multiple stages of debate: a  where the bill is formally introduced into Assembly business, a  where general debate on the bill occurs, a  where a bill is sent to a committee to be scrutinised clause-by-clause and for amendments to be considered, a  where any amendments (or possibly a recommendation to reject the bill) agreed in the committee are voted on by the legislature, and finally a  where the bill is read with all amendments and approved or rejected in its entirety.

When a debate concludes, the motion in question is put to a vote. The Assembly first votes by voice vote; the Speaker or Deputy Speaker puts the question, and members respond either "Yes!" (in favour of the motion) or "No!" (against the motion). The presiding officer then announces the result of the voice vote, but if his or her assessment is challenged by any member or the voice vote is unclear, a recorded vote known as a division follows. The presiding officer, if she or he believes that the result of the voice vote is clear, may reject the challenge. When a division occurs, bells are rung through the Assembly premises to attract the attention of members outside the chamber but within the premises. Members then vote through the electronic voting equipment at their desks; the results are then sent to the Speaker who then announces them.

If there is an equality of votes, the Speaker or Deputy Speaker has a casting vote. In Westminster tradition, this casting vote is exercised to allow further debate, if this is possible, or otherwise to avoid a decision being taken without a majority (e.g. voting 'No' to a motion or the third reading of a bill, but 'Yes' to a second reading).

The outcome of most votes is largely known beforehand, since political parties normally instruct members on how to vote. A party normally entrusts some members of the Assembly, known as whips, with the task of ensuring that all party members vote as desired. Members do not tend to vote against such instructions, since those who do so jeopardise promotion, may be deselected as party candidates for future elections, or may be expelled from the party altogether. Ministers, junior ministers and parliamentary private secretaries who vote against the whips' instructions usually resign from their posts. Thus, the independence of non-independent members of the Assembly tends to be low. A member is also traditionally allowed some leeway if the particular interests of his constituency are adversely affected. In some circumstances, however, parties may announce "free votes", allowing members to vote as they please – these are typically on matters of ethics and conscience.

Membership and elections 

Sarawak is, as of 2019, divided into 82 state constituencies, each directly electing one member to the Legislative Assembly under the first-past-the-post voting system. The Assembly may legislate to alter the number of members in the Assembly.

The conduct of elections and electoral matters are bound by part 8 of the federal constitution, but other unspecified electoral matters are within the exclusive jurisdiction of the federal government. All elections and boundary determinations are therefore conducted by the federal Election Commission of Malaysia and are not overseen by any state authority.

State elections are triggered whenever the Assembly is dissolved. Dissolution is a prerogative of the Governor, but by convention this is only done so on the advice of the Premier. Notwithstanding this, the Assembly is automatically dissolved five years after the first sitting following an election.

Any Malaysian resident in Sarawak who are at least age 21 may be elected to the membership of the Assembly, unless they were convicted of an offence in Malaysia that has not been pardoned, are a bankrupt, holding an office of profit (except that of a native chief), are of unsound mind, convicted of electoral fraud or possess voluntary citizenship of another country. Only Malaysian citizens resident in Sarawak, or are last resident in Sarawak if residing outside Malaysia, and are registered on the electoral roll may vote in state elections. Overseas Sarawakians retain the electoral franchise regardless of the duration they are away from the country.

A member is formally styled "Member of the Legislative Assembly" in English and may use the post-nominal letters "MLA". The Malay style is "Ahli Dewan Undangan Negeri" and the post-nominals are "ADUN". Informally and in the media however, they are often titled "state assemblyman" or "state assemblywoman" as appropriate.

Eligibility 
Membership in the Assembly is restricted to Malaysian citizens residing in Sarawak who are at least 21 years old. However, an eligible person may also be temporarily disqualified from election or the membership in several ways.

A person may not sit in the Assembly if they are "of unsound mind" – this has not been tested in recent times. A person is also ineligible while they are an undischarged bankrupt or are holding an office of profit (besides that of a native chief).

A person who has failed to formally lodge a return of election expenses in relation to an election for the Assembly or either chamber of Parliament, or was convicted of an offence anywhere in Malaysia and was sentenced to imprisonment for at least one year or fined at least 2000 Malaysian ringgit and has not been pardoned, or resigned from this Assembly or the Assembly of any other state, are disqualified from the membership for five years from that event (in the case of imprisonment, the disqualification persists until five years after the person is released from custody). The Governor, with the consent of the Chief Minister by convention, may remove the disqualification for the former two.

A person may be disqualified if they have been previously convicted of an electoral offence with respect to elections for the Assembly or Parliament. There is no mechanism to restore eligibility once disqualified under this clause. A person may also be disqualified for voluntarily acquiring or exercising the rights of citizenship in another country – Malaysian citizenship may be lost for doing so as multiple citizenship is not recognised.

An MLA is disqualified from the remainder of an Assembly term if they resigned from the political party that they stood for in the previous election and had voluntarily undertook to the Speaker that they would not do so.

Members may concurrently hold membership in both the Assembly and Parliament – they are not required to resign from either legislature.

Officers

Speaker and Deputy Speaker 
The Governor, on the advice of the Chief Minister, appoints one person from the membership of the Assembly or, in deviation from traditional Westminster practices, from non-members who are qualified to be elected as members of the Assembly, as the presiding officer of the Assembly, known as the Speaker, and another person from the membership of the Assembly to be Deputy Speaker. The lengths of their service are specified by the letters patent that appointed them; however, their term may end premature if they no longer qualify for the membership of the Assembly, they resign, or the Governor terminates their speakership on the advice of the Premier. The Speaker is also disqualified from the chair if they have any personal interest in another organisation; the Deputy Speaker does not need to vacate their office if they have such interests, but is barred from presiding over any matter that affects their interests.

The Speaker or Deputy Speaker presides from a chair at the front of the chamber (opposite the entrance). The Speaker may discipline members who fail to observe the rules of the Assembly. The Speaker or Deputy Speaker remain members of their respective parties while holding the speakership, but they are required by convention to act impartially while presiding over the Assembly. A Speaker or Deputy Speaker who is also an elected member of the Assembly retain voting rights, but by convention does not vote in proceedings they preside over except to break a tie, only doing so according to Speaker Denison's rule.

List of Speakers

Secretary and Deputy Secretary 
The Secretary and Deputy Secretary of the Legislative Assembly are civil servants that serve as the chief advisers of procedural matters, as well as head the day-to-day administration of the Assembly. They serve a similar role to the Clerk of the House of Commons in the United Kingdom, advising the Speaker on the rules and procedure of the Assembly, signing orders and official communications, and signing and endorsing bills. They are permanent officials and not members of the Assembly. The Governor has the sole power to appoint or remove them.

Other officers 
The  maintains the law, order and security of the Assembly, within the chamber and on the premises of the Assembly building. The Serjeant-at-Arms also carries the ceremonial mace, a symbol of the authority of the Governor and of the Legislative Assembly, into the chamber each day in front of the Speaker, and the mace is laid upon the Table of the Assembly during sittings.

Committees 
The Legislative Assembly uses committees for a variety of purposes, e.g. for the review of bills. Committees consider bills in detail, and may make amendments. This committee sits in the main chamber itself.

Committees can also be created for any purpose – these are known as Select Committees. However, the Select Committees of the Assembly primarily handle administrative matters of the chamber. For example, the Selection and Standing Orders Committee meet to select members of other committees as well as consider changes to the Standing Orders; the Public Petitions Committee handles petitions of any matter from the public; and the Privileges Committee considers questions of parliamentary privilege, as well as matters relating to the conduct of the members. Committees need to be re-established at the beginning of each term.

List of legislative terms

See also 
 Cabinet of Sarawak

Notes

References

External links 
 

 
Politics of Sarawak
State legislatures of Malaysia
Unicameral legislatures